Miroslavo ("Mirko") Vindiš (born 8 November 1963 in Ptuj) is a retired long-distance runner from Slovenia, who won the 1988 edition of the Vienna Marathon. He represented Yugoslavia (1988) and Slovenia (1992) in the men's marathon at the Summer Olympics. Vindiš set his personal best of 2:13:39 on 1 November 1987 at the New York Marathon. He also represented Yugoslavia and Slovenia in the marathon at the World Championships in Athletics.

He also ran ultramarathons and was the bronze medallist at the IAU 100 km European Championships in 2001.

Achievements

References

1963 births
Living people
People from Ptuj
Yugoslav male long-distance runners
Slovenian male long-distance runners
Yugoslav male marathon runners
Slovenian male marathon runners
Slovenian ultramarathon runners
Olympic athletes of Slovenia
Olympic athletes of Yugoslavia
Athletes (track and field) at the 1988 Summer Olympics
Athletes (track and field) at the 1992 Summer Olympics
Male ultramarathon runners